A Woman Alone may refer to:
 A Woman Alone (1917 film), an American silent drama film
 A Woman Alone (1936 film), a British drama directed by Eugene Frenke
 An alternative title for the 1936 film Sabotage, directed by Alfred Hitchcock
 A Woman Alone (1956 film), an Italian drama film directed by Vittorio Sala 
 An alternative title for the 1981 film A Lonely Woman, directed by Agnieszka Holland
 A monologue by Dario Fo, performed by Franca Rame
 A Woman Alone, a 1988 British television film by Dario Fo and Franca Rame on the anthology series ScreenPlay